George Crespigny Brabazon Vivian, 4th Baron Vivian  (21 January 1878 – 28 December 1940) was a British soldier from the Vivian family who served with distinction in both the Second Anglo-Boer War and World War I.

Early life
He was born at Connaught Place, London, on 21 January 1878 to Hussey Vivian, 3rd Baron Vivian and Louisa Duff.

He was educated at Eton College where he rowed in the VIII and was elected into Pop. Succeeding to the title in October 1893, at the age of 15, he took his seat in the House of Lords in February 1900. He subsequently joined the British Army and was commissioned a cavalry officer as second lieutenant in the 17th Lancers on 14 March 1900.

Military career
Lord Vivian served with considerable distinction in the Second Anglo-Boer War.

Battle of Elands River
On 17 September 1901, Smuts' commando encountered the 17th Lancers in the vicinity of Tarkastad.  Smuts realised that the Lancers' camp was their one opportunity to re-equip themselves with horses, food and clothing.  A fierce fight, subsequently to be known as the Battle of Elands River took place with the Lancers being caught in a cross-fire and suffering heavy casualties.  Stunned by the onslaught, the remaining Lancers put up a white flag.  Deneys Reitz, a younger commando member, encountered Captain Victor Sandeman, the Lancers' commander, and Vivian, who was his lieutenant, among the wounded.

In his book Commando, Deneys Reitz, one of the Boers, recounts how Vivian pointed out his bivouac tent and told him it would be worth his while to take a look at it.  Soon, Reitz, who had been wearing a grain-bag and using an old Mauser rifle with only two rounds of ammunition left, was dressed in a cavalry tunic and riding breeches and armed with a Lee-Metford sporting rifle. Reitz reports that he met Lord Vivian again in London in 1935, on excellent terms.

Thomas Pakenham, in his introduction to the 1983 Jonathan Ball edition of Commando, reports a more elaborate story. In this touching account, Vivian overcomes Reitz's reluctance to take Vivian's possessions, and presents Reitz's original rifle to him in London in 1943. As Vivian died in 1940 this is impossible.

Later military service
Recovering from wounds received in the battle, Vivian returned to the United Kingdom in December 1901.

He later served in the First World War, being appointed to the Distinguished Service Order in 1918.

Among his medals were the Distinguished Service Order, the Legion of Honour, and the Croix de Guerre. He was appointed aide-de-camp to King Albert I of Belgium. He was also awarded the Ordre de Leopold avec Palme, Officier.

Marriages and children
On 1 August 1903 Vivian married Barbara Cicely Fanning. They had two children:

 Hon Daphne Winifred Louise Vivian (11 July 1904 - 5 December 1997)
 Anthony Crespigny Claude Vivian, 5th Baron Vivian (4 March 1906 - 24 June 1991)

They divorced in 1907. The co-respondent was Alfred Curphey. 

Lord Vivian was married secondly on 5 January 1911 to Nancy Lycett Green (died 6 May 1970), daughter of Sir Edward Lycett Green, 2nd Baronet. They also had two children:

 Hon Ursula Vanda Maud Vivian (16 June 1912 - 11 November 1984)
 Hon Douglas David Edward Vivian (16 January 1915 - 27 July 1973)

He died on 28 December 1940, aged 62.

References

Barons in the Peerage of the United Kingdom
People educated at Eton College
1878 births
1940 deaths
People from Westminster
British Army personnel of the Second Boer War
British Army personnel of World War I
17th Lancers officers
Companions of the Distinguished Service Order
Deputy Lieutenants of Cornwall
British Yeomanry officers
George
Eldest sons of British hereditary barons